Yves-Michel Marti is a pioneer in the field of Competitive Intelligence. He is the founder of Egideria and of the French branch of the Society of Competitive Intelligence Professionals.

Education 
He holds a graduate engineering degree in Telecommunications and 2 Master of Sciences degrees (Microelectronics and Solid-State Physics) from the University of Grenoble, France. He has a Master of Business Administration from Insead, France.  Mr. Marti speaks 6 languages : French, English, Spanish, Portuguese, Russian and Classical Arabic.

Career 
He was a design engineer of military radars components and of Computer Aided Design software at Dassault Electronique (France), then Pacific Monolithics (Sunnyvale, California, USA), and visiting scientist at Hewlett Packard  (Santa, Ana, California, USA). He then held sales, marketing and general management responsibilities with Lucas Industries (Birmingham, UK).

His work on modeling high frequency circuits received an award from the National Science Foundation, and he gave a course at the Master of Sciences level at the University of California, Berkeley in the USA. He also taught at HEC in France, and at the Fundação Dom Cabral in Brazil.

Intelligence industry 
In 1992, he co-founded the French branch of the Society of Competitive Intelligence Professionals, and served as its Secretary General for 6 years.

In 1994, he founded Egideria, a company specializing in competitive intelligence investigations, which was listed as one of the top French companies in the industry by the newsletter  Intelligence Online in 2003, then in 2006, and by the daily newspaper Le Figaro in 2007.

Research 
Egideria’s investigations are based on innovative guidelines (the Ethical Bible), recognized by academia. Mr Marti developed innovative tools for strategic information analysis, especially in the context of mergers and acquisitions, which were applied during the takeover of the petroleum multinational Elf by Total

In 1996, Yves-Michel Marti co-authored the book L'Intelligence économique et concurrentielle : les yeux et les oreilles de l'entreprise which received the Best European Business Book Award from the Financial Times and Booz Allen Hamilton. Business Digest review considers it as a management classic.

In 1997 at the SCIP conference in San Diego, Mr Marti delivered the breakthrough and controversial communication What can one learn from the Intelligence System of the Roman Catholic Church?.

Published Books 
 Collective book under the direction of Eric Denecé, ‘’Renseignement et espionnage de la Renaissance à la Révolution (XVe- XVIIIe siècles)’’, Ellipses, 2021, .
 Bruno Martinet, Yves-Michel Marti, ‘’L'intelligence économique : les yeux et les oreilles de l’entreprise’’, Éditions d'Organisation, 1996 new edition 2001,.
 Jean-Marie Lepeule and Yves-Michel Marti, ‘’Benchmarking et intelligence économique’’, Eurostaf, 1999, .
 Collective book under the direction of Benjamin Gilad and Jan P. Herring, ''The Art and Science of Business Intelligence Analysis’’, JAI Press, 1996,  .
 Collective book under the direction of Robert Soares, ‘’Gallium Arsenide MESFET Circuit Design’’, Artech House, 1988, .

References

Market researchers
Business writers
INSEAD alumni
Living people
Year of birth missing (living people)